"Lonely Swedish (The Bum Bum Song)" is a novelty song by Canadian comedian Tom Green, created in 1999 for The Tom Green Show. When the show moved to MTV, Green released it as a single, encouraging visitors to download the song (an mp3) for free from his website, burn it onto CDs and distribute it to friends. The music video was filmed by Jeff Boggs in Seattle, Washington.

This song's nonsensical, comedic lyrics deal with various objects upon which the narrator's buttocks are placed, such as a step, a taxi, a railing, cheese, bubblegum, a dog, a cat, a telephone, an old man, a boat (inaccurately described as a battleship), and the letters SWEDISH in front of the Swedish Medical Center, from which the name of the song is derived. He claims that the objects become lonely when he is not there to put his bum on them before asking the listeners to "get the poo off my bum".

Overview
The song came about when Green recorded a comedy sketch on a cruise ship as he wandered the decks bothering people. Following an altercation with a ship employee, he began rubbing his bottom against a rail, singing, "My bum is on the rail, my bum is on the rail." The incident inspired Green to compose the full song.

Green filmed a music video and aired it on his MTV talk show The Tom Green Show, encouraging viewers to call MTV's Total Request Live (TRL) and request the song. The song became so popular that TRL eventually made Green retire it from the show.

Legacy
The song's promotional music video was a great success on Total Request Live. It was retired the day it reached number one on the countdown (27 August 1999), and after just five total days on the show. Green stated that the reason for retiring the video was that "it's not fair to 98 Degrees." Later, in his autobiography Hollywood Causes Cancer, he revealed that MTV had pressured him to do so in order to maintain the image that Total Request Live was, in fact, a live show. The next week's episodes had already been taped on-location, and the producers of the show were completely unaware of the song at the time.

See also

References

1999 debut singles
1999 songs
novelty songs
Tom Green songs